Malan Kruger (born 12 April 1995) is a Namibian first-class cricketer. He played in the 2014 ICC Under-19 Cricket World Cup. He made his List A debut on 29 March 2022, for Namibia A against the Ireland Wolves in Windhoek.

References

External links
 

1995 births
Living people
Namibian cricketers
Namibia Twenty20 International cricketers
Place of birth missing (living people)